Education in the British Virgin Islands is largely free and is a requirement for children ages 5 to 17. The British Virgin Islands has a total of 15 public primary schools and 4 secondary public schools. In addition to the public schools, there are 10 primary private schools and 3 secondary private schools. The School year is from September to June. The British Virgin Islands is a part of the British Overseas Territories and therefore the educational system is very similar to the traditional learning system in the United Kingdom. Primary schools are focused on establishing the basics of an academic curriculum and host students between the ages of 5 to 12. After the completion of primary school (seven years), students move on to secondary school (five years) and pre-university (two years). Secondary school is for students between the ages of 13 and 17. Following the completion of secondary education, students may write their Caribbean Secondary Education Certificate. There are approximately 2,700 students who attend primary school for the first 7 years of their required education; however less than 1,800 students successfully finish the following 4 required years of secondary school and complete their certificate exam  incorrect, https://bvinews.com/87-percent-success-in-grade-12-top-school-named/]. Students who chose to continue their education after the secondary education certificate may move on to an additional 2 years of schooling (Caribbean Advanced Proficiency Examinations). Passing the exams entitles students the right to continue their studies even further at the University of the Virgin Islands. At the University, students can obtain associate, bachelors, and master's degrees in the departments of business, education, liberal arts and social sciences, or science and mathematic.

Becoming Enrolled

Students have the opportunity to apply to any school of their choice due to the lack of zoning. A student must apply for placement for both private and public institutions through the Department of Education. Applications are accepted between January and April for the following school year. Many documents must be submitted along with an application.

Documents Needed for Enrollment:
 child's birth certificate
 updated immunization form
 passport photo
 letter of good health
 transcripts from previous institutions (if applicable)
 parent's passport
 parent's work permit OR government appointment letter
 if attending a private school, an acceptance letter
Once documents are accepted and reviewed, prospective students may be asked to take a placement exam.

Homeschooling

Parents of student are required to submit an application to the Department of Education to achieve the right to homeschool their child. Students are still required to take and pass examinations. Curriculums for homeschooled children may be just as if not more demanding than the curriculums and educational institutions.

ICT Policies

The Department of Education in the British Virgin Islands is improving schools greatly by resolving maintenance issues and increasing access along with use of ICT in both public primary and secondary schools. Teachers are expected to gain ICT skills in college and university education. The DOE requires that all Public primary schools have at least 1 lab room consisting of at least 10 computers per lab. In addition, each school must have an ADSL Internet connection.

Educational institutions
Tertiary:
 H. Lavity Stoutt Community College

Primary and secondary schools

Public schools
 Primary and secondary schools
 Claudia Creque Educational Centre (formerly Anegada Primary and Secondary School) - Anegada
 Bregado Flax Educational Centre - Virgin Gorda

 High schools
 Elmore Stoutt High School (formerly BVI High School) - Tortola
 The Virgin Islands School of Technical Studies - [Tortola]

 Primary schools
 Enis Adams Primary School
 Belle Vue (Joyce Samuel) Primary School
 Ivan Dawson Primary School
 Leonora Delville Primary School
 Francis Lettsome Primary School
 Alexandrina Maduro Primary School
 Isabella Morris Primary School
 Robinson O'Neal Memorial Primary School
 Althea Scatliffe Primary School
 Ebenezer Thomas Primary School
 Jost Van Dyke Primary School
 Willard Wheatley Primary School

 Pre-primary schools
 Enid Scatliffe Pre-Primary School

 Other
 Eslyn Richiez Learning Centre
 Pre-Vocational Centre

Private schools
Private schools include:
 BVI Seventh Day Adventist School
 Cedar School
 Century House Montessori School
 Cornerstone School
 Seabreeze School
 Scott's Educational Institute 
 St. George's School
 Valley Day School

Further reading
 Gaible, Edmond. "Survey of ICT and Education in the Caribbean ." Info Dev. N.p., Feb. 2009. Web. 19 Oct. 2015. <https://www.infodev.org/infodev-files/resource/InfodevDocuments_597.pdf>.
 Thomas, Emel. Education in the Commonwealth Caribbean and Netherlands Antilles. N.p.: A&C Black, 2014. 131-51. Web. 14 Oct. 2015. <https://books.google.com/books?id=NqlQAwAAQBAJ&pg=PA150&dq=Education+in+the+British+Virgin+Islands&hl=en&sa=X&ved=0CDcQ6AEwAWoVChMI9_G6loHCyAIVRhw-Ch09hwGh#v=onepage&q=British%20Virgin%20Islands&f=fal>.

References